Hominy Hill Golf Course is a public 18-hole golf course in Colts Neck, New Jersey, operated by the Monmouth County Park System. The course was established in 1964 and was designed by Robert Trent Jones. 

The course measures 7,049 yards from the blue tees and has a USGA course and slope ratings of 73.8 and 135 from the blue tees. Scattered throughout the course are 138 bunkers, with water coming into play at four holes. Seasonal wildflowers enhance the out-of-play areas.  

Course amenities include a well-stocked golf center, GHIN handicapping, food concession snack bar, and an immaculately manicured putting green.

Tournaments
Hominy Hill has been the host of two USGA National Amateur Public Links championships, as well as numerous regional championship tournaments.

External links 

Hominy Hill – GolfLink
Hominy Hill – Monmouth County Park System

Buildings and structures in Monmouth County, New Jersey
Colts Neck Township, New Jersey
Golf clubs and courses designed by Robert Trent Jones
Golf clubs and courses in New Jersey
1964 establishments in New Jersey